Alasdair Alpin MacGregor (March 20, 1899 – 1970) was a Scottish writer and photographer, known for a large number of travel books. He wrote also on Scottish folklore, and was a published poet.

Life
He was born at Applecross, Ross and Cromarty, on 20 March 1899, the son of Colonel John MacGregor M.D. of the Indian Medical Service. He was educated at Tain Academy.

MacGregor was brought up in Tain and Inverness, and educated there and in Edinburgh. His books were mainly about Scotland, and his romanticising style incurred the displeasure of Compton Mackenzie, who caricatured him in some of his novels (perhaps unjustly so as MacGregor was forced to be critically realistic about certain aspects of life on the west coast, in his book The Western Isles). Judging by the title of the 1931 book A Last Voyage to St. Kilda. Being the Observations and Adventures of an Egotistic Private Secretary who was alleged to have been 'warned off' That Island by Admiralty Officials when attempting to emulate Robinson Crusoe at the Time of Its Evacuation there might have been something to caricature. In partial explanation, St Kilda was evacuated in 1930; at the time he was Private Secretary to the Chancellor of the Duchy of Lancaster. The same book was the subject of a legal case when MacGregor brought an injunction to prevent the distribution of The Edge of the World, a film by Michael Powell that he claimed was based on it. MacGregor lost the case.

He lived in London for most of his adult life in Swan Court and Upper Cheyne Row, Chelsea. Along with T. Ratcliffe Barnett, an Edinburgh minister and author, MacGregor reflects a transitional period during the first half of the 20th century when the north of Scotland was still rural and mostly unaffected by modern society.

MacGregor was also a campaigner against cruelty to animals, including vivisection and hunting for sport. In the years before his death in 1970, he visited the United States often and was a mentor to a young Marion Barry, who later became mayor of Washington, D.C.

His book about his childhood, The Goat Wife, tells the evocative story of his hard working and resourceful Aunt Dorothy, who left a comfortable existence in Edinburgh's Ann Street - reputed to be the most haunted street in Edinburgh - to begin life as a solo crofter in the Easter Ross village of Ardgay (then known locally as "High Wind"). Spanning the period before the First World War until the end of the Second, it captures the last remnants of the simplicity, privations and charm of Scottish rural community life. The "Victor" in the book is the poet Frederick Victor Branford.

Publications

 Behold the Hebrides! (First published 1925, Revised Edition 1948)
 Over the Sea to Skye: Or, Ramblings in an Elfin Isle (1926)
 Summer Days Among The Western Isles (1929)
 A Last Voyage To St. Kilda (1931)
 Searching the Hebrides With a Camera (1933)
 The Haunted Isles: Or, Life in the Hebrides (1933)
 The Peat-Fire Flame: Folk-tales and Traditions of the Highlands and Islands (1937)
 The Goat Wife: Portrait of a Village (1939)
 Vanished Waters: Portrait of a Highland Childhood (1946)
 The Western Isles (1949)
 Skye and the Outer Hebrides (1953)
 Auld Reekie: Portrait of a Lowland Boyhood (1955)
 The Ghost Book: Strange Hauntings in Britain (1955)
 The Turbulent Years: A Portrait of Youth in Auld Reekie (1956)
 Journeyman Taylor: The Education of a Scientist (1958, rewrite of the Thomas Griffith Taylor autobiography)
 Phantom Footsteps: A Second Ghost Book (1959)
 Percyval Tudor-Hart: Portrait of an Artist (1961)
 The Golden Lamp: Portrait of a Landlady (1964)
 Land of the Mountain and the Flood (1965)
 The Enchanted Isles (1967)
 The Farthest Hebrides (1969)
 Islands by the Score (1971)

Notes

1899 births
1970 deaths
Scottish folklorists
Scottish memoirists
Scottish travel writers
Scottish photographers
People from Ross and Cromarty
19th-century Scottish people
20th-century Scottish poets
Scottish male poets
20th-century British male writers